Gewirtz may refer to:

David Gewirtz, CNN columnist and Pulitzer Prize candidate
Howard Gewirtz, American television writer
Paul Gewirtz, American professor of constitutional law
Russell Gewirtz, American screenwriter
The Gewirtz graph, named after American mathematician Allan Gewirtz

See also
Gewertz